Terry Sweeney is an American artist, actor, and writer. He was a writer and cast member of Saturday Night Live in the 1980s, co-wrote the 1989 film Shag, and has written for the television series MADtv, Hype, and Tripping the Rift.

Early life and career 
Terry Sweeney was born in Queens, New York and raised in Massapequa Park, New York as the younger of two children to Terrence, a butcher, and Lenore Sweeney. As a child, he was bullied and found solace in books and movie musicals as well as in performing his own Broadway plays. At a young age, his interest in the performing arts grew and he became a star of the high school talent show. He graduated Farmingdale High School in 1969 and attended Middlebury College, where he continued his studies in Spanish and Italian, and graduated in 1973 with a bachelor of arts degree.

Saturday Night Live 
Sweeney was a regular cast member of Saturday Night Live (SNL) during that program's 1985–86 season. After college, Sweeney started out doing performance art as various drag characters at New York City venues. A rave New York Times review of "Banned in France" led to an audition at SNL for the series producer Lorne Michaels. Sweeney, who is not related to fellow SNL alumna Julia Sweeney, was also a sketch writer for SNL during the early 1980s under producer Jean Doumanian prior to being hired as a member of the cast.

Sweeney was SNL'''s first openly gay male cast member; he was out prior to being hired as a cast member. Sweeney's run on the show came at a time when there were few openly gay characters or actors on television.

During his season on SNL, he became known for his celebrity impersonations, particularly female impersonations of stars like Diana Ross, Patti LaBelle, Joan Collins, Brooke Shields's mother Teri Shields, and Joan Rivers, as well as Ted Kennedy (the only male celebrity he impersonated). His most notable recurring character was a portrayal of then-First Lady Nancy Reagan.

While at SNL, Sweeney’s roles were almost exclusively gay stereotypes and exaggerated female impersonations.

While hosting the show, former cast member Chevy Chase engaged in so much allegedly homophobic taunting, Sweeney described him as a "monster".

 Other credits 
Sweeney has written for the FOX TV series MADtv, The WB's short-lived sketch comedy series Hype (and co-created), and Sci Fi Channel's Tripping the Rift, among a few others, all with his partner, Lanier Laney. Sweeney's major film credit was as the co-screenwriter for the film Shag, which was released in 1989.

Sweeney also performed a stand-up routine for the special Coming Out Party in 2000, which centered on his rough childhood in the 1960s, how he explored his sexuality in the 1970s, how he tried to survive the 1980s with the AIDS epidemic, conservative politics, and being open about his sexuality when he was chosen to be a cast member for Saturday Night Live (making history as the first openly gay male actor to ever appear on a network TV show); and his post-SNL life, when he and Lanier Laney cared for Laney's mother, who had Alzheimer's disease and did not know her son was a homosexual.

He is the author of two published books. The first, Nancy Reagan: It's Still My Turn (1990) which started as performance art piece at Highways in Santa Monica, and transferred to New York's the Actor's Playhouse Off Broadway.  His second book, Irritable Bowels and the People Who Give You Them (2015), is a collection of comic essays about his life in Hollywood.  In 2018 he appeared in two episodes of FX's Emmy Award-winning The Assassination of Gianni Versace: American Crime Story as David Gallo.

 Episodes of Tripping the Rift written by Sweeney and Laney 
"Mutilation Ball" (also written with Sy Rosen)
"Power to the Peephole"
"Android Love"
"Roswell"
"Creaturepalooza"
"Chode's Near-Death Experience"
"Six, Lies, and Videotape"

 Personal life 
Terry Sweeney's husband is Lanier Laney, an artist and comedy writer who also wrote for SNL in the 1985–1986 season. According to a 2000 magazine article, they first met as members of a sketch comedy troupe called the "Bess Truman Players" before joining SNL. Laney and Sweeney were also writing partners for Saturday Night Live during the 1985–1986 season, the film Shag, and the Syfy Channel cartoon Tripping the Rift''. As of 2012, the couple reside in Los Angeles and Beaufort, South Carolina.

References

External links 

Living people
American male actors
American gay actors
American gay writers
American LGBT screenwriters
Gay comedians
American television writers
American male television writers
People from Queens, New York
People from Massapequa Park, New York
American sketch comedians
Comedians from New York (state)
Middlebury College alumni
Screenwriters from New York (state)
Year of birth missing (living people)
American LGBT comedians